Mystic River may refer to one of these US rivers, both in the New England region :
Mystic River, in eastern Massachusetts, US.
 Mystic River (Connecticut), in southeastern Connecticut, US

Mystic River may also refer to:
 Mystic River (novel), by Dennis Lehane
 Mystic River (film), directed by Clint Eastwood and based on the novel
 Mystic River Rugby Club, a rugby club from Malden, Massachusetts, US
The Mystic River, a Nigerian TV show

See also 
 Mystic (disambiguation)